Åland has a multi-party system with numerous political parties, in which a party often has no chance of gaining power alone, and parties must work with each other to form coalition governments.

Parties with elected representation at the national or international level

Former parties
Åland Progress Group (Ålands Framstegsgrupp)
Ålandic Left (Åländsk Vänster)
Free Åland (Fria Åland)
Greens on Åland (Gröna på Åland)

See also
 Politics of Åland
 List of political parties by country

Aland
 
Political parties Aland